The Conservatorio di Musica Benedetto Marcello di Venezia is a conservatory in Venice, Italy named after composer Benedetto Marcello and established in 1876.

History
The conservatory was established in 1876 as Liceo e Società Musicale Benedetto Marcello, became communal in 1895 under the name Liceo Civico Musicale "Benedetto Marcello", and attained conservatory status in 1915 as Liceo Civico Musicale Pareggiato Benedetto Marcello. In 1940, under the directorship of Gian Francesco Malipiero, it became Conservatorio di Stato "Benedetto Marcello". The conservatory is housed in Palazzo Pisani a Santo Stefano - built between 1614 and 1615 -, located facing Campo Santo Stefano in the sestiere of San Marco. The building is  owned by the municipality of Venice.

Courses
The conservatory offers courses in singing, solfège, music dictation, score reading, music composition, jazz music, electronic music, choral music, orchestration, and in playing guitar, harp, piano, violin, flute, lute, double bass, saxophone, trumpet, cello, percussion instruments, oboe, bassoon, clarinet and organ.

The conservatory accepts foreign students, provided that they pass an entry test and have sufficient knowledge of the Italian language.

Directors
 Marco Enrico Bossi
 Ermanno Wolf-Ferrari
 Gian Francesco Malipiero
 Gabriele Bianchi

Faculty
 Gino Tagliapietra
 Francesco de Guarnieri 
 Ettore Gracis
 Bruno Maderna
 Giuseppe Sinopoli

Notable alumni

Further reading

External links
 Official Web site

Notes
 	

Venice
Education in Venice
1876 establishments in Italy
Educational institutions established in 1876